The 2017 Ju-Jitsu World Championship were the 15th edition of the Ju-Jitsu World Championships, and were held in Bogota, Colombia from November 24 to November 26, 2017.

Schedule 
24.11.2017 – Men's Fighting System, Men's Jiu-Jitsu (ne-waza), Women's Duo System – Classic, Mixed Duo System – Show
25.11.2017 – Men's and Women's Fighting System, Men's Jiu-Jitsu (ne-waza), Men's Duo System – Classic, Women's Duo System – Show
26.11.2017 – Women's Jiu-Jitsu (ne-waza), Men's Duo System – Show, Mixed Duo System – Classic, Team event

European Ju-Jitsu

Fighting System

Men's events

Women's events

Duo System

Duo Classic events

Duo Show events

Brazilian Jiu-Jitsu

Men's events

Women's events

Team event

References

External links
Online Results
Official results (PDF)
Team event results (PDF)